Douglas Clyde Paschal (born March 5, 1958) is a former American football running back in the National Football League who played for the Minnesota Vikings. He played college football for the North Carolina Tar Heels.

Personal life 
Paschal's son, Mark Paschal, also played football for the North Carolina Tar Heels.

References 

1958 births
Living people
American football running backs
Minnesota Vikings players
North Carolina Tar Heels football players